Tricholoma uropus is an agaric fungus of the genus Tricholoma. Found in Singapore, it was described as new to science in 1994 by English mycologist E.J.H. Corner. He described a variety, T. uropus var. majusculum.

See also
List of Tricholoma species

References

uropus
Fungi described in 1994
Fungi of Asia
Taxa named by E. J. H. Corner